UMC may stand for:

Organizations

Companies and  businesses
 Vodafone Ukraine, formerly Ukrainian Mobile Communications,  the second-largest mobile operator in Ukraine 
 Union Metallic Cartridge Company, a subsidiary of Remington Arms ("Company" is not normally included the acronym, resulting in "UMC")
 United Microelectronics Corporation, Taiwanese semiconductor company
 Unicorn Microelectronics Corporation, its American subsidiary
 Universal Media Corporation, Sharp Corporation manufacturing subsidiary in Poland
 Urban Movie Channel, the first premium streaming service for Black TV and film. Owned by AMC Networks privately-owned subsidiary, RLJ Entertainment

Hospitals and medical facilities
 United Medical Center, a hospital in Washington, DC
 Ljubljana University Medical Centre, the largest hospital centre in Slovenia
 University Medical Center, a hospital in partnership with Texas Tech University Health Sciences Center in Lubbock, Texas
 University Medical Center of Southern Nevada in Las Vegas, Nevada
 University Medical Center (Tucson, Arizona) at the University of Arizona in Tucson
 University Medical Center Utrecht in The Netherlands
 University Memorial Center at the University of Colorado at Boulder

Universities
 University of Minnesota Crookston
 University of Mississippi Medical Center
 University of Missouri (University of Missouri–Columbia, non-standard; MU is the preferred acronym)

Other organizations
 United Methodist Church
 Uppsala Monitoring Centre (WHO Collaborating Centre for International Drug Monitoring)

Music
 "U.M.C. (Upper Middle Class)", a song by Bob Seger from Seven
 The U.M.C.'s, a rap group
 Universal Mind Control, an album by rapper Common
 UMC, a record label owned by Universal Music Group

Other
 UMC - User Management Center
 UMC (Computer), a Polish computer using negabinary arithmetic
 Uniform Mechanical Code
 Uppaal Model Checker
 USB mass-storage device class
 Undifferentiated mesenchymal cell
 Upper middle class